New York–style pizza is pizza made with a characteristically large hand-tossed thin crust, often sold in wide slices to go. The crust is thick and crisp only along its edge, yet soft, thin, and pliable enough beneath its toppings to be folded in half to eat. Traditional toppings are simply tomato sauce and shredded mozzarella cheese.

This style evolved in the U.S. from the pizza that originated in New York City in the early 1900s, itself derived from the Neapolitan-style pizza made in Italy. Today, it is the dominant style eaten in the New York metropolitan area states of New York and New Jersey, and is variously popular throughout the United States. Regional variations exist throughout the Northeast and elsewhere in the U.S.

History

The first pizzeria in the United States, Lombardi's, was founded by Gennaro Lombardi in New York City's Little Italy in 1905, though this has recently been challenged by author Peter Regas. An immigrant pizzaiolo (pizza maker) from Naples, he opened a grocery store in 1897; eight years later, it was licensed to sell pizza by New York State. An employee, Antonio Totonno Pero, began making pizza, which sold for five cents a pie. Many people, however, could not afford a whole pie and instead would offer what they could in return for a corresponding sized slice, which was wrapped in paper tied with string. In 1924, Totonno left Lombardi's to open his own pizzeria on Coney Island, called Totonno's.

The original pizzerias in New York used coal-fired ovens and baked their pizza with the cheese on the bottom and sauce on top.
By 2010, over 400 pizza restaurants existed in New York City, with hundreds more of varied cuisine also offering the dish.

Characteristics

New York–style pizza is traditionally hand-tossed, consisting in its basic form of a light layer of tomato sauce sprinkled with dry, grated, full-fat mozzarella cheese; additional toppings are placed over the cheese. Pies are typically around 18 to 24 inches (45 to 60 cm) in diameter, and commonly cut into eight slices. These large wide slices are often eaten as fast food while folded in half along the crust both for convenience—allowing the slice to be eaten one-handed—and to control the flow of oil running off the pie in both directions.

New York–style pizza gets its distinguishing crust from the high-gluten bread flour with which it is made. Minerals present in New York City's tap water supply are also credited with giving the dough in metro area pies its characteristic texture and flavor. Some out-of-state pizza bakers even transport the water cross-country for the sake of authenticity. However, many dispute this, claiming a similarly high-quality pizza can be made elsewhere with otherwise similar techniques and ingredients.

Typical condiments include dried oregano, dried red chili pepper flakes, garlic powder, dried basil, and grated Parmesan cheese.

Gallery

Regional variations
New York–style pizza is most prevalent in New York, New Jersey, Pennsylvania, and Connecticut, but can be found throughout the Northeastern region and beyond. Outside this area, many pizzas described as "New York–style", including those of major pizza chains such as Pizza Hut, generally do not fall within the variations commonly accepted as genuine in its native area.

See also

 Pizza in the United States
 Pizza by the slice
 Chicago-style pizza
 Detroit-style pizza

References

External links

 
 A detailed recipe for the domestic production of authentic New York–style pizza by Jeff Varasano

Pizza in the United States
Pizza styles
Italian-American culture in New York City
Sicilian-American cuisine
Italian-American cuisine

Pizza